Air Marshal P. K. Desai PVSM AVSM VSM (born November 12, 1944) is a retired officer of the Indian Air Force (IAF). He served in the IAF from 1966 to 2004. Desai was Air Officer Commanding of Air Force Station Chakeri in Kanpur, and additionally served as Senior Maintenance Staff Officer of Maintenance Command in Nagpur and as Assistant Chief of Air Staff Engineering at Air Headquarters in New Delhi.

Scientific contribution
Desai worked on research and development aspects of indigenisation of the IAF. He was chair of Aeronautical Society of India (Uttar Pradesh and Bihar). He also served on scientific committees at National Aerospace Laboratories (NAL) and Indian Society of Non-Destructive Testing (ISNDT).

Works
• Ripudaman Singh and P. K. Desai. Metallic Birds: The Life Beyond. India Defense Review. Vol 12 (1). Editor: Major General Afsir Karim AVSM (retd.). ISSN 0970-212. ISBN 81-7062-275-1.

• P. K. Desai and C. Mohanty. Pragmatic Approach to Indigenisation: Case Studies of Airborne Items. Aerospace Manufacturing Technology. Editors: N. K. Naik, Kanchan Biswas, G. C. Popli.

• P. K. Desai. Life Extension of Aircraft Components, An IAF Perspective.

Diplomatic service
Desai served as Deputy Air Attache at Indian Embassy in Moscow. Later, he was part of several Indian delegations to Russia and Ukraine, and completed defense contracts successfully. He was a member of Indian delegation to Russia led by Defense Minister George Fernandes in 2002.

Honours and decorations
The Government of India conferred on Desai Param Vishisht Seva Medal (PVSM), Ati Vishisht Seva Medal (AVSM) and Vishisht Seva Medal (VSM).

Post-retirement
Desai is the President of Air Force Association of Gujarat since retirement from the IAF. The association looks after the welfare of retired Air Force personnel and is also involved in community service.

References 

Indian Air Force air marshals
1944 births
Defence Services Staff College alumni
Recipients of the Param Vishisht Seva Medal
Recipients of the Ati Vishisht Seva Medal
Recipients of the Vishisht Seva Medal
Living people